Corin Henry (born October 5, 1988) is an American professional basketball player for Kocaeli BŞB Kağıtspor of the Turkish Basketball First League. He played college basketball for Ranger College and Tarleton State University.

High school career
Henry attended New Town High School in Owings Mills, Maryland. In his senior year, he averaged 24.9 points per game and helped the team make the state semi-finals with a win-loss record of 20–4.

College career

Ranger College
Henry attended Ranger College in Ranger, Texas from 2007 to 2009. In his sophomore season in 2008–09, he was a first team selection to the North Texas Junior College Athletic All-Conference Team. He averaged 14.4 points, 3.3 assists and 1.8 steals per game while helping his team to a 20–10 record.

Tarleton State University
In 2009, Henry transferred to Tarleton State University in Stephenville, Texas for his remaining two college years. In his junior season in 2009–10, he was selected to the LSC All-Tournament Team and was an All-LSC Honorable Mention selection. In 32 games for the Texans, he averaged 11.8 points, 4.2 assists, 3.8 rebounds and 1.7 steals in 30.4 minutes per game.

In his senior season, he was named the 2011 All-LSC South Division Defensive Player of the Year, as well as named to the All-LSC South Division First Team. Henry led the Texans in scoring, assists and steals per game. In 30 games, he averaged 14.2 points, 4.2 assists, 2.9 rebounds and 1.8 steals in 30.1 minutes per game.

Professional career

2011–12 season
On June 21, 2011, Henry signed with Team FOG Næstved of Denmark for the 2011–12 season. In 37 games, he averaged 22.1 points, 5.1 assists, 4.4 rebounds and 3.4 steals per game. Henry led Næstved to the semi-finals but they were eliminated in a 90–75 Game 5 loss to Svendborg Rabbits, despite Henry scoring a game-high 27 points, and also adding 8 rebounds and 3 assists.

2012–13 season
On May 24, 2012, Henry signed with the Sydney Kings for the 2012–13 NBL season.

He quickly adapted to the NBL and was named player of the week in Round 2 and Round 10. Henry was later voted a reserve for the 2012 North All-Stars. Unfortunately, he did not make the game after he was hospitalized due to dehydration, and Jamar Wilson of the Cairns Taipans was brought in as his replacement.

On February 9, 2013, against the New Zealand Breakers, Henry suffered a hard fall that resulted in a torn wrist tendon, effectively ruling him out of the remaining 6 games of the regular season for the Kings. In 22 games for the Kings in 2012–13, he averaged 13.2 points, 3.9 rebounds, 2.9 assists and 1.1 steals per game.

2013–14 season
In August 2013, Henry signed with BC Rilski Sportist of Bulgaria for the 2013–14 season. In November 2013, he left Rilski after appearing in just eight games.

On March 24, 2014, Henry signed with the Waikato Pistons for the 2014 New Zealand NBL season. He appeared in all 18 games for the Pistons in 2014, averaging 19.3 points, 4.1 rebounds, 5.5 assists and 1.9 steals per game.

2014–15 season
On December 16, 2014, Henry signed with Team FOG Næstved of Denmark for the rest of the 2014–15 season, returning to the club for a second stint. In 21 games for Næstved, he averaged 17.2 points, 5.1 rebounds, 5.6 assists and 2.3 steals per game.

2015–16 season
In July 2015, Henry signed with Jämtland Basket of Sweden for the 2015–16 season. In 32 games for the club, he averaged 20.6 points, 4.3 rebounds, 5.7 assists and 2.1 steals per game.

On May 27, 2016, Henry signed with the Sandringham Sabres for the rest of the 2016 SEABL season. In 15 games for the Sabres, he averaged 12.4 points, 3.9 rebounds and 3.5 assists per game.

2016–17 season
On June 29, 2016, Henry signed with ALM Évreux Basket of France for the 2016–17 season.

2017–18 season
In July 2017, Henry signed with Düzce Belediye of the Turkish Basketball First League.

2021–22 season
On January 25, 2022, Henry signed with Kocaeli BŞB Kağıtspor of the Turkish Basketball First League.

Personal
Henry is the son of Carol Henry and Orin Henry, and has two siblings, Jamillah and Jamel.

References

External links
Swedish League profile
Tarleton State bio

1988 births
Living people
ALM Évreux Basket players
American expatriate basketball people in Australia
American expatriate basketball people in Bulgaria
American expatriate basketball people in Denmark
American expatriate basketball people in France
American expatriate basketball people in Iran
American expatriate basketball people in New Zealand
American expatriate basketball people in Slovenia
American expatriate basketball people in Sweden
American expatriate basketball people in Turkey
American expatriate basketball people in Uruguay
American men's basketball players
Basketball players from Maryland
BC Rilski Sportist players
Jämtland Basket players
Ranger Rangers men's basketball players
People from Randallstown, Maryland
Point guards
Sandringham Sabres players
Sportspeople from Baltimore County, Maryland
Sydney Kings players
Tarleton State Texans men's basketball players
Waikato Pistons players